Carmen (minor planet designation: 558 Carmen) is a minor planet orbiting the Sun. As with a number of asteroids discovered by Max Wolf, it is named after a female character in opera, in this case the title character of Bizet's Carmen. This is classified as an M-type asteroid that spans a girth of approximately 59 km. The near infrared spectrum of this object is described as featureless. Some evidence for iron-poor orthopyroxenes on the surface has been reported.

References

External links 
 
 

000558
Discoveries by Max Wolf
Named minor planets
558 Carmen
000558
19050209
Georges Bizet